These are the list of results that England have played from 1960 to 1969.

1960 
Scores and results list England's points tally first.

1961 
Scores and results list England's points tally first.

1962 
Scores and results list England's points tally first.

1963 
Scores and results list England's points tally first.

1964 
Scores and results list England's points tally first.

1965 
Scores and results list England's points tally first.

1966 
Scores and results list England's points tally first.

1967 
Scores and results list England's points tally first.

1968 
Scores and results list England's points tally first.

1969 
Scores and results list England's points tally first.

Year Box 

1960–69
1959–60 in English rugby union
1960–61 in English rugby union
1961–62 in English rugby union
1962–63 in English rugby union
1963–64 in English rugby union
1964–65 in English rugby union
1965–66 in English rugby union
1966–67 in English rugby union
1967–68 in English rugby union
1968–69 in English rugby union